Walking Britain's Lost Railways is a British documentary television series presented by Rob Bell that first aired on Channel 5 on 21 September 2018. A second series premiered on Channel 5 on 9 February 2020. A third series premiered on Channel 5 on 27 November 2020. A fourth series premiered on Channel 5 on 15 October 2021.

History
Presenter Rob Bell walks sections of British railways that were closed during the Beeching cuts of the early 1960s, telling the history and current stories associated with the lost routes.

Episodes

Series 1 (2018)

Series 2 (2020)

Series 3 (2020)

Series 4 (2021)

References

External links

Channel 5 (British TV channel) original programming
2018 British television series debuts
2010s British documentary television series
2020s British documentary television series
English-language television shows
Documentary television series about railway transport
Rail transport in Great Britain
Television shows set in England
Television shows set in Scotland
Television shows set in Wales